SS Kehuku was a Design 1031 tanker ship built for the United States Shipping Board immediately after World War I.

History
She was laid down at yard number 3471 at the Wilmington, Delaware shipyard of the Bethlehem Wilmington Shipyard, one of 6 Design 1031 tankers built by Bethlehem for the United States Shipping Board. An additional 5 ships were built by the Terry Shipbuilding Company of Savannah, Georgia. She was launched on 10 April 1920, completed in June 1920, and named Kehuku. Total cost was $1,947,618. In 1926, she was purchased by Chile SS Co Inc (New York City), and renamed Chiloil. In 1935, she was purchased by American Tankers of Delaware (Wilmington). In 1943–1944, she was returned to the War Shipping Administration. She was broken up in the 2q of 1947 in Mobile, Alabama by Hugget.

References

Bibliography

1920 ships
Merchant ships of the United States
Design 1031 ships
Tankers of the United States